Signe (minor planet designation: 459 Signe), provisional designation , is a stony asteroid from the background population of the intermediate asteroid belt, approximately 26 kilometers in diameter. It was discovered by German astronomer Max Wolf at Heidelberg-Königstuhl State Observatory on 22 October 1900. The asteroid was presumably named after Signy, a character of the Scandinavian Völsunga saga and Norse mythology. Signy is the daughter of Völsung and sister of Sigmund.

References

External links 
 Asteroid Lightcurve Database (LCDB), query form (info )
 Dictionary of Minor Planet Names, Google books
 Asteroids and comets rotation curves, CdR – Observatoire de Genève, Raoul Behrend
 Discovery Circumstances: Numbered Minor Planets (1)-(5000) – Minor Planet Center
 
 

000459
Discoveries by Max Wolf
Named minor planets
000459
19001022